Altınordu Selçuk-Efes Football Complex, shortly ASEFT, is a sport complex of football stadiums operated by the football club Altınordu S.K., and is located in Selçuk town of Izmir Province in western Turkey.

Leased in 2012 by the Izmir-based Altınordu S.K., it consists of five football fields, and is home to the youth football teams Altınordu S.K. Following the lease, two pitches were completely renovated. All pitches are of natural grass ground but one is covered with organic granular material and special artificial grass.

International events hosted

 2015 Izmir U-12 Cup: 48 teams from 20 nations - April 3–5, 2015
 2016 UEFA Women's Under-17 Championship qualification - Group 1 - October 15–20, 2015

References

External links

Football venues in Turkey
Sports venues in İzmir
Selçuk District
Altınordu S.K.